Christelle Janssens (born 26 February 1972) is a Belgian former freestyle swimmer. She competed in two events at the 1988 Summer Olympics.

References

External links
 

1972 births
Living people
Belgian female freestyle swimmers
Olympic swimmers of Belgium
Swimmers at the 1988 Summer Olympics
People from Arlon
Sportspeople from Luxembourg (Belgium)